Botyodes principalis is a moth in the family Crambidae. It was described by John Henry Leech in 1889. It is found in China, India, Russia, Taiwan and Japan.

References

Moths described in 1889
Spilomelinae